Oath Bound is the sixth full-length album by Summoning. Not counting certain pieces from the soundtrack of The Lord of the Rings, "Mirdautas Vras" is the first song ever to be written entirely in the Black Speech of Mordor. The songs "Might and Glory" and "Land of the Dead" both feature a self-sung choir chorus similar to that which was used on the Let Mortal Heroes Sing Your Fame song "Farewell". Being 21 seconds longer than Dol Guldur, this album was Summoning's longest release before the release of the version of Old Mornings Dawn containing bonus tracks. It also contains the band's longest song, Land of the Dead.

Track listing
All Songs Written By Protector & Silenius, except where noted. (2006 Summoning/Iron Avantgarde Publishing)

Notes
The name Oath Bound was selected because of its relationship with the Silmarillion theme the album has, which is in reference to the Oath of Fëanor.
The album cover, as well as pages in the booklet, were made from paintings made by German-American painter Albert Bierstadt.
A mini-CD was supposed to be released in 2007 containing at least one song that did not have space on Oath Bound, due to Summoning not wanting the album to go over 70 minutes.

Credits
Protector - guitars, drum sounds, vocals on 2, 4 and 8
Silenius - keyboards, vocals on 3, 5, 6 and 7

Production
Arranged & Produced By Summoning
Recorded & Engineered By Protector

External links
Summoning's "Oath Bound" at Discogs

References

2006 albums
Summoning (band) albums
Napalm Records albums